Mississippi v. Johnson, 71 U.S. (4 Wall.) 475 (1867), was the first suit to be brought against a President of the United States in the United States Supreme Court. The state of Mississippi attempted to sue President Andrew Johnson for enforcing Reconstruction. The court decided, based on a previous decision of Marbury v. Madison that the President has two kinds of tasks: ministerial and discretionary. Discretionary tasks are ones the president can choose to do or not to do, while ministerial tasks are ones required by his office: those whose failure to perform could leave him in violation of the Constitution. The court ruled that by enforcing Reconstruction, Johnson was acting in an "executive and political" capacity—a discretionary rather than a ministerial one—and so he could not be sued.

See also
List of United States Supreme Court cases, volume 71
United States v. Nixon (1974)

Further reading

External links

 

United States Supreme Court cases
United States Supreme Court cases of the Chase Court
United States separation of powers case law
1867 in United States case law
1867 in Mississippi
Johnson
Andrew Johnson